Koncertówka part 1 is Pidżama Porno's first bootleg, and their eighth in career album, released on 2 September, 2002. This album contains tracks recorded on XII birthday in Poznań - December 2000 (tracks 1–15). Tracks no 16 and 17 are from Proxima - October 2001. Track no 18 is a sample from the movie Wodzirej.

Track listing

The band
Krzysztof "Grabaż" Grabowski – vocal 
Andrzej "Kozak" Kozakiewicz – guitar
Sławek "Dziadek" Mizerkiewicz – guitar
Julian "Julo" Piotrowiak – bass guitar
Rafał "Kuzyn" Piotrowiak – drums

Guests
Robert Brylewski
 Tymon Tymanski
Zygmunt Staszczyk

References
http://pidzamaporno.art.pl/?p=plyta&id=1

Pidżama Porno albums
2002 live albums